Schadeleben is a village and a former municipality in the district of Salzlandkreis, in Saxony-Anhalt, Germany. Since 15 July 2009, it is part of the town Seeland.

Schadeleben is the place of origin of the Annecke family. There have been a number of famous family members in the United States in the 19th and 20th century.

 Fritz Anneke, German 1848er and US Colonel in the Civil War
 Emil Anneke, brother of Fritz and first Republican Michigan Auditor General 
 Mathilde Franziska Anneke, wife of Fritz, 1848er, famous U.S. feminist, suffragette, anti-abolitionist, college founder, writer and publisher
 Percy Shelley Anneke, son of Fritz and Mathilde, sales rep of Schlitz Brewing Company until 1883, co-CEO of Fitger Brewery in Duluth 1883-1920
 Victor H Anneke, son of Percy, Vice-President of Fitger in the 1920s, helped the company survive the prohibition, president of Rotary Club Duluth in 1927/8

References 

Former municipalities in Saxony-Anhalt
Seeland, Germany